This article details Trailer No. 59 of the Manx Electric Railway on the Isle of Man.

This is the smallest item of passenger stock on the railway, and referred to as the Royal Saloon or sometimes "doll's house" owing to its diminutive size.  It became known as the royal saloon/trailer after a visit to Royal Ramsey (so dubbed from the visit) by Queen Victoria and has since carried royalty on a few occasions.  It remains rarely used in traffic and stored at Derby Castle Depôt after a number of years on display at the visitors' centre at the terminus.

References

Sources
 Manx Manx Electric Railway Fleetlist (2002) Manx Electric Railway Society
 Island Island Images: Manx Electric Railway Pages (2003) Jon Wornham
 Official Official Tourist Department Page (2009) Isle Of Man Heritage Railways

Manx Electric Railway